The ICC Women's Rankings were launched on 1 October 2015 covering all three formats of women's cricket. The ranking system gives equal weight to results of Test, ODI, and T20 matches. It was designed by statistician and ICC Cricket Committee member David Kendix and utilizes the same methodology as men's cricket rankings. Each team scores points based on the results of their matches over the last 3−4 years − all matches played in the 12-24 months since the first of October before last, plus all the matches played in the 24 months before that, for which the matches played and points earned both count half. 

On 1 October of every year, the matches and points earned between 3 and 4 years ago are removed, and the matches and points earned between 1 and 2 years ago switch from 100% weighting to 50% weighting. For example, on 1 October 2014, the matches played between October 2010 and September 2011 were removed, and the matches played between October 2012 and September 2013 switched to 50% weighting. This happens overnight, so can result in teams changing positions in the ranking table despite no one playing.

In October 2018 following the ICC's decision to award T20 International status to all members, the Women's rankings were split into separate ODI (for Full Members) and T20I lists.

ODI Rankings

T20I Rankings

References

International Cricket Council awards and rankings